Alexander Early Steen (1827 – December 7, 1862) was a career American soldier from Missouri who served in the United States Army in the Mexican–American War. He rejoined the army in 1852 and served until he resigned to join the Confederate forces on May 10, 1861. He served as a general in the secessionist Missouri State Guard forces and as a colonel and acting brigadier general in the Confederate States Army during the American Civil War. He was killed in the Battle of Prairie Grove.

Military career 
Steen was commissioned from civilian life as a second lieutenant to the 12th U.S. Infantry in early 1847  (contrary to some sources, he never attended the US Military Academy). He served at Jefferson Barracks in St. Louis, Missouri, beginning in May 1847. By the mid-1850s, Steen was promoted to first lieutenant in the 3rd U.S. Infantry and assigned to duty at Fort Union in the New Mexico Territory, where he led several lengthy reconnaissance patrols scouting for hostile Indians.

With the outbreak of the Civil War in 1861, many Missourians were forced to choose sides, especially after the state's neutrality came under test when pro-secessionist forces began organizing, and fighting between Unionists and secessionists became imminent. Steen returned to Missouri and was commissioned as the Lt Colonel of the Second Regiment, Missouri Volunteer Militia (MVM), a position he held concurrently with his commission in the U.S. Army. The Second Regiment, MVM, was composed primarily of members of the pro-secession "Minutemen" paramilitary organization. This unit was arrested by U.S. troops at Camp Jackson, on the outskirts of St. Louis on May 10, 1861, on suspicion of disloyal activities. Steen avoided arrest at Camp Jackson and reportedly submitted his resignation from the U.S. Army the same day.

On June 11, 1861, Steen was appointed as a brigadier general in the secessionist Missouri State Guard (MSG) under its commander, Major General Sterling Price, serving as drillmaster at the State Guard encampment at Cowskin Prairie near the Arkansas border. He also commanded the Fifth Division of the Missouri State Guard (mostly raw recruits) early in the war. On June 22, 1861, he received an appointment as a captain in the Regular Confederate Army's Corps of Infantry, to date to March 16, 1861. As a Missouri State Guard general, Steen led his brigade at the Battle of Wilson's Creek and the First Battle of Lexington.

Death and burial 
When his Missouri State Guard brigade was sent to northern Mississippi in April 1862, he became ill at Memphis, Tennessee and returned to Missouri. In November 1862, with the Missouri troops still east of the Mississippi River, Steen was appointed colonel, commanding the 10th Missouri Infantry Regiment (Confederate). He was killed during the fighting at the Battle of Prairie Grove on December 7, 1862, and his body was recovered and shipped to Fort Smith.

Steen is buried in the Fort Smith National Cemetery. A memorial to Unknown Confederate Dead, made of marble, commemorates Steen, as well as Brigadier General James M. McIntosh, an Arkansan who was killed at the Battle of Pea Ridge.

Relations 
Steen was a brother-in-law of fellow Confederate general Lewis Henry Little. He was also a first cousin of Arkansas Governor Henry M. Rector.

See also 

 List of American Civil War generals (Acting Confederate)

References

Bibliography 
 Allardice, Bruce S. More Generals in Gray. Baton Rouge: Louisiana State University Press, 1995. .
 Eicher, John H., and Eicher, David J., Civil War High Commands, Stanford University Press, 2001, .
 Journal of the Congress of the Confederate States of America, 1861-1865, Richmond, Virginia: Printer of the Confederate States Congress, 1861.
 National Park Service website for Fort Union
 "Missouri in the Civil War" adapted from Confederate Military History by Clement A. Evans, Confederate Publishing Company, Atlanta, Georgia, 1899.
 National Park Service website for Fort Smith National Cemetery
 Missouri Sons of Confederate Veterans website for Jefferson Barracks

External links 
 
 Alexander Early Steen: Veteran of Two Wars, Fort Smith National Cemetery, Sebastian County, Arkansas
 Reenactors, 10th Missouri Infantry, CSA

Confederate States Army generals
People of Missouri in the American Civil War
Confederate States of America military personnel killed in the American Civil War
United States Military Academy alumni
United States Army officers
Missouri State Guard
1827 births
1862 deaths